Helle Aro (born 9 December 1960) is an Estonian athlete. She competed for Finland in the women's heptathlon at the 1992 Summer Olympics.

References

1960 births
Living people
Athletes (track and field) at the 1992 Summer Olympics
Estonian heptathletes
Finnish heptathletes
Olympic athletes of Finland
People from Rapla
Finnish people of Estonian descent